Bishnupur district (Meitei pronunciation: /ˌbɪʃnʊˈpʊə/) is a district of Manipur state in northeastern India.

Etymology
Its name is derived from a Vishnu temple located at Lamangdong.

Geography
Bishnupur town is the administrative headquarters of the district. Other major towns in this district are: Nambol, Moirang, Ningthoukhong, and Kumbi.
Major village in this district are Nachou, Ngaikhong Khullen, Toubul, and Khoijuman Khullen.

Demographics
According to the 2011 census Bishnupur district has a population of 237,399, roughly equal to the nation of Vanuatu. This gives it a ranking of 583rd in India (out of a total of 640). Its population growth rate over the decade 2001-2011 was 15.36%.	Bishnupur	has a sex ratio of 	1000	females for every 1000 males, and a literacy rate of 76.35%.

Languages
Primary language spoken is Meiteilon. Other minority languages spoken includes Rongmei, Nepali, Bengali, Hindi and Thadou.

Flora and fauna

Administrative divisions

The district is divided into 3 sub-divisions:
 Bishnupur
 Nambol
 Moirang

Villages 
 

Reangzaeng Village

See also 
 List of populated places in Bishnupur district

References

External links
 Bishnupur district website

 
Districts of Manipur